Krzysztof Brejza (born 16 May 1983 in Bydgoszcz, Poland) is a Polish politician, currently serving as Member of the Sejm of the Republic of Poland, representing the Bydgoszcz district. Between 2005 and 2006 he was a member of the Kuyavian-Pomeranian Regional Assembly.

Career
Brejza is a graduate of the Law and Administration Faculty of University of Warsaw.

In the 2002 Polish local elections he was elected to the Regional Assembly representing one of the Bydgoszcz City districts. Having received 1,512 votes and coming second on the Civic Platform and Law and Justice (POPiS) list behind Maciej Świątkowski, Brejza was not initially elected. Only after Świątkowski was elected to the Sejm of the Republic of Poland (the lower house of the Polish parliament) in the 2005 parliamentary elections did Brejza take over his seat in the Regional Assembly. He served only one year, until the end of his term.

In the 2006 local elections, he ran again for the Regional Assembly. Scoring 2,874 votes in the 1st Bydgoszcz City district, he came fourth on the Civic Platform list and wasn't elected, as Civic Platform only won three seats.

In the 2007 parliamentary elections, he was elected to the Sejm of the Republic of Poland from the Civic Platform list in the 4th district (Bydgoszcz) with 6,441 votes. He was reelected in the 2015 elections with 15,951 votes.

His father Ryszard Brejza is also a politician, having been a Member of the 6th Sejm of the Polish Republic (1997-2001) and currently serving as President (Mayor) of Inowrocław, a role he has held since 2002.

2019 parliamentary election campaign surveillance
In December 2021, the news emerged that Senator Brejza was under surveillance according to the Citizen Lab at the University of Toronto. The surveillance took place during the 2019 Polish parliamentary election campaign and involved the use of Pegasus spyware, which the Polish government-controlled secret service is unofficially in possession of. Brejza was head of the Civic Coalition election campaign at the time and it is alleged that the spying could have affected the results of the elections won by the conservative Law and Justice party leading to calls for setting up an investigation committee into the case. In January 2022, the Polish Senate passed a resolution to establish a special committee to investigate this matter.

See also
 Kuyavian-Pomeranian Regional Assembly
 Bydgoszcz's parliamentary district
 List of Sejm members (2007–2011)

References

External links
 (pl) Krzysztof Brejza - Sejm VI Term page - includes declarations of interest, voting record, and transcripts of speeches.

1983 births
Living people
Politicians from Bydgoszcz
Members of the Polish Sejm 2007–2011
Civic Platform politicians
Members of the Polish Sejm 2011–2015
Members of the Polish Sejm 2015–2019
Members of the Senate of Poland 2019–2023